Neyestan or Nistan or Nayastan may refer to:
 Neyestan, Kerman
 Neyestan, Markazi
 Neyestan, Razavi Khorasan
 Neyestan, Birjand, South Khorasan Province
 Neyestan, Tabas, South Khorasan Province
 Neyestan, West Azerbaijan
 Neyestan, Yazd